Tiempo Transcurrido ("Running Time") is Café Tacuba's first compilation album, released in 2001. According to the band, it was released due to a contractual obligation, as the original contract signed with WEA Latina stated that they must release five albums, and with no new material, Tiempo Transcurrido dropped in music stores on August 21.  The album itself chronicles Café Tacuba's work in reverse order, starting with Revés (originally titled "13" on Revés/Yo Soy) and ending with "La Dos."  The only new song on this compilation is a live rendition of "El Baile Y El Salón."  The album cover is noted for referencing each of their four albums up to that point, with the debut album cover being reversed and superimposed over the other three album covers.

Band members
 Ñru (Rubén Albarrán): vocals, guitar
 Emmanuel del Real: keyboards, acoustic guitar, piano, programming, vocals, melodeon
 Joselo Rangel: electric guitar, acoustic guitar, vocals
 Quique Rangel: bass guitar, electric upright bass, vocals

Track listing

References

Café Tacuba albums
2001 greatest hits albums